Simon Nord Bolze (born 30 July 1995) is a South African rugby union player who last played for the  in the Currie Cup and in the Rugby Challenge. His usually plays as a fly-half, but can also play as an inside centre.

Rugby career

2011–13: Schoolboy rugby / Border

2014: Blue Bulls

After high school, Bolze moved to Pretoria where he joined the  academy. He started four matches for the s in the 2014 Under-19 Provincial Championship and played off the bench in three more matches. He scored 47 points in his seven appearances – the eighth-most in Group A of the competition and the third-highest for the Blue Bulls – which included a personal haul of 16 points in a match against the s, which also saw him score his only try in the competition. He was also named on the bench for the s' match against , but remained an unused replacement.

2015–: Eastern Province Kings / NMMU Madibaz

For 2015, Bolze returned to the Eastern Cape, joining the Port Elizabeth-based . He made six appearances for the  team in the 2015 Under-21 Provincial Championship Group A, their first season at that level after winning promotion from Group B in 2014. After starting the first five matches in a row, kicking 16 points, he missed several matches through injury before returning for one more match against his former side, the s.

He made six appearances for the team – starting five of those – and kicked 21 points. It was a disappointing season overall, though, as the team finished second-bottom on the log. After the 2016 Varsity Cup, Bolze was one of several youngsters that were included in the  squad that competed in the 2016 Currie Cup qualification series. However, he picked up an ankle injury during that match, which saw him miss the next few weeks of action.

References

South African rugby union players
Living people
1995 births
People from Queenstown, South Africa
Rugby union fly-halves
Rugby union centres
Eastern Province Elephants players
Rugby union players from the Eastern Cape